Grafton High School is the name of several high schools:

Australia
Grafton High School (New South Wales), Grafton, New South Wales

United States
Grafton High School (North Dakota), Grafton, North Dakota
Grafton High School (Massachusetts), Grafton, Massachusetts
Grafton High School (Virginia), Yorktown, Virginia
Grafton High School (West Virginia), Grafton, West Virginia
Grafton High School (Wisconsin), Grafton, Wisconsin